Gujgi-ye Bala (also Romanized as Gūjgī-ye Bālā and Gūjkī-ye Bālā; also known as Bīūkī, Bū’īkī, Bujgi, Gūjgī, and Gūjkī) is a village in Tabadkan Rural District, in the Central District of Mashhad County, Razavi Khorasan Province, Iran. At the 2006 census, its population was 511, in 137 families.

References 

Populated places in Mashhad County